Francis Robert "Frank" Hinkins (14 October 1852 – 6 August 1934) was an English author, photographer and illustrator. Among his works were Romany Life (1915 Mills & Boon, under nom de plume 'Frank Cuttriss') and Water-colour drawings of British spiders and their webs; he is best known for contributing many of the photographs in his friend Arthur Mee's famous book The Children's Encyclopædia.

References

English illustrators
1852 births
1934 deaths